Micheal "Sugar" Ray Richardson (born April 11, 1955) is an American former professional basketball player and head coach. He played college basketball for the Montana Grizzlies. The No. 4 overall pick in the 1978 NBA draft, Richardson played in the National Basketball Association (NBA) for eight years with the New York Knicks, Golden State Warriors and New Jersey Nets. He was a four-time NBA All-Star, and led the league in steals in three seasons. He later became a head coach in the Continental Basketball Association (CBA) and National Basketball League of Canada (NBL Canada).

Early life
Richardson was born in Lubbock, Texas, the son of Billy Jack Richardson and Luddie Hicks. Richardson was a 1974 graduate of Manual High School in Denver, Colorado. He averaged 10 points on a talented team and did not start for the varsity until he was a senior. Richardson played on the 1972 state championship team.

College career
Richardson played collegiately at the University of Montana. He was recruited to the Big Sky Conference school by Hall of Fame Coach Jud Heathcote after Richardson's Denver basketball friend David Berry had visited the school.

As a freshman in 1974-1975 Montana went 21-8 and qualified for the 1975 NCAA Division I Basketball Tournament, as Richardson averaged 7.5 points and 3.6 rebounds. The Grizzlies defeated Utah State 79-63, before losing to the eventual National Champion UCLA Bruins 67-64. Montana then lost to UNLV in the regional 3rd place game.

Richardson averaged 18.2 points, 6.3 rebounds and 3.8 assists as a sophomore in 1975-1976, as Montana finished 13-12. After the season, Coach Heathcote left for Michigan State University, where he would win the 1979 NCAA title.

Under Coach Jim Brandenburg, who had been an assistant under Heathcote, Richardson averaged 19.2 points, 8.6 rebounds and 3.6 assists as Montana finished 18-8 in 1976-1977.

As a senior, Richardson averaged 24.2 points and 6.9 rebounds in 1977-1978, and Montana finished 20-8, capturing the Big Sky regular-season title.

In his Montana career, Richardson averaged 17.1 points, 6.3 rebounds and 3.7 assists on 49% shooting in 107 career games. Richardson was First team All-Big Sky Conference as a sophomore, junior and senior.

Today, Richardson still shares the Montana single-game scoring record of 40 points, and holds the single-game record for field goals of 18 and the single-season scoring average record of 24.2. Richardson is third on the Montana career assists list (372), second in career scoring (1,827 points) and ninth in career rebounding.

Professional career

New York Knicks (1978–1982)
The New York Knicks drafted Richardson with the fourth overall pick in the 1978 NBA draft, and he was billed as "the next Walt Frazier." Two picks later, the Boston Celtics drafted future Hall of Famer Larry Bird. In his second year, Richardson became the third player in NBA history (Slick Watts – 1976, Don Buse – 1977) to lead the league in both assists (10.1) and steals (3.2), setting the Knicks' franchise records in both categories. He also recorded 18 triple-doubles, the second-most in franchise history. During the 1980-81 NBA season, Richardson made his second All-Star game, scoring 11 points, grabbing 5 rebounds, and recording 4 steals in a 123-120 Eastern Conference victory. The Knicks eventually finished 50-32 and Richardson made the playoffs for the first time in his career. However, in the first round, Richardson, who averaged 11.5 points, 9.5 rebounds, 5.5 assists, and 3.5 steals per game in the series, and the Knicks lost in an upset to the Reggie Theus-led Chicago Bulls. The following season, on November 27, 1981, Richardson scored his highest single game total as a Knick, with 33 points in a 116-95 win over the Cleveland Cavaliers.

Golden State Warriors (1982–1983)
At the beginning of the 1982–83 season, on October 22, 1982, Richardson was traded to the Golden State Warriors (along with a fifth-round draft choice) in exchange for Bernard King. On February 5, 1983, Richardson recorded a double-double with 10 points and 11 assists, while adding 9 steals, in a 106-102 win over the San Antonio Spurs. After playing only 33 games for the Warriors, Richardson was traded to the New Jersey Nets in exchange for Sleepy Floyd and Mickey Johnson on February 6, 1983.

New Jersey Nets (1983–1986)
In the 1984 playoffs, Richardson led the Nets to a shocking upset of the defending champion Philadelphia 76ers. In the fifth and deciding game, he scored 24 points and had six steals. In the following series, against the Milwaukee Bucks, Richardson led the Nets to a Game 4 victory with a team high 24 points. However, the Nets would ultimately lose the series in six games. In 1985, Richardson was named the NBA Comeback Player of the Year after averaging 20.1 points and leading the league in steals while playing all 82 games, after only playing 48 games in the prior season due to rehabilitating from substance abuse. On October 30, 1985, Richardson barely missed a quadruple-double when he scored 38 points, grabbed 11 rebounds, recorded 11 assists, and stole the ball 9 times, during a 147-138 win over the Indiana Pacers. Richardson wore Leather Converse All Stars briefly with the  Nets, making him the last to wear the shoe in any form in the NBA.

In 556 career NBA games, Richardson averaged 14.8 points, 5.5 rebounds, 7.0 assists and 2.6 steals. In 18 career playoff games, he averaged 15.7 points, 7.2 rebounds, 5.5 assists and 2.8 steals.

NBA ban
On February 25, 1986, Richardson was banned for life by NBA commissioner David Stern for three violations of the league's drug policy. He regained the right to play in the NBA in 1988, but decided to continue his career in Europe. He never played in the NBA again, despite being reinstated.

Richardson bitterly complained that the suspensions he received from the NBA were unfair given the fact that Chris Mullin was never disciplined by the league for his well-documented alcohol problem, implying that this "double standard" existed because Richardson is Black while Mullin is White, and became a frequently cited example of destructive lifestyles in the NBA.

Long Island Knights (1986–1987) 
Richardson played with the Long Island Knights of United States Basketball League in 1986–87.

Albany Patroons (1987–1988) 
Richardson played with the Albany Patroons of the CBA in 1987–88, before playing for 14 seasons in Europe.

Europe (1988–2002) 
Richardson signed with Virtus Bologna, a prominent European team (1988–1991). Richardson played for KK Split (1991–1992), Baker Livorno (1992–1994), Olympique Antibes (1994–1997), Cholet Basket (1997–1998) and Montana Forlì (1998–1999). Richardson played for Basket Livorno (1999–2000), Olympique Antibes again (2001) and finally, AC Golfe-Juan-Vallauris (2002) at age 47.

Richardson won the European-wide second-tier level FIBA Cup Winners' Cup, in the 1989–90 season with Virtus Bologna. He won the LNB Pro A championship with Olympique Antibes in 1995.

Coaching career

Albany Patroons (2004–2007) 
On December 14, 2004, he was named head coach of the Albany Patroons in the CBA. Richardson had previously played with Albany in 1987-1988, when it won its second CBA championship under Coach Bill Musselman.

Anti-Semitic and homophobic comments 
On March 28, 2007, Richardson was suspended for the remainder of the CBA championship series for comments in an interview with the Albany Times Union , in which he stated that Jews were "crafty (because) they are hated worldwide." The paper also reported that Richardson directed expletives at a heckler, using profanity and an anti-gay slur, at Game 1 of the championship series.

Some sportswriters came to Richardson's defense, in the wake of the incident. Peter Vecsey questioned the Times Unions motives in not releasing the audio recording of their exchange with Richardson. Vecsey noted that during the course of his professional dealings with Richardson, he found the player to be "so unsettled, so unsophisticated and so pliable anybody could draw him into saying anything about anything at any time." He also pointed out that Richardson's second wife was Jewish, as was their daughter, Tamara, something that would be unlikely for a true anti-Semite. Christopher Isenberg, a Jewish writer who had earlier profiled Richardson for the Village Voice also defended Richardson's remarks about Jews, stating in a blog post entitled "Jews for Micheal Ray,"

Micheal Ray is proud to have a Jewish lawyer because he thinks they are the best lawyers. Certainly it's a stereotype, but it's a stereotype rooted in a reality. A disproportionate number of the great lawyers in America are Jews. A disproportionate number of the great basketball players in America are black. We have learned to be very careful around these facts because here the line between fact and "stereotype" can get very blurry and if you're not careful, you can get into deep water real quick. Micheal Ray was unwise to have been so indiscreet around reporters, but it wasn't exactly Elders of Zion territory. 

NBA commissioner David Stern, who was Jewish, voiced support for Richardson. While conceding that the remarks about homosexuals were "inappropriate and insensitive" and worthy of a suspension, Stern said, "I have no doubt that Micheal Ray is not anti-Semitic. I know that he's not...He may have exercised very poor judgment, but that does not reflect Micheal Ray Richardson's feelings about Jews."

Ze'ev Chafets, author of A Match Made in Heaven: American Jews, Christian Zionists and One Man's Exploration of the Weird and Wonderful Judeo-Evangelical Alliance, wrote in the Los Angeles Times that Richardson's comments, while perhaps stereotypical, were not anti-semitic. After discussing Richardson's claim that Jews are "crafty," Chafets stated,

What other hurtful things did Richardson supposedly say? That Israel has the best airport security in the world? This is both true and something Israel itself brags about. That Jews are hated and need to protect themselves? That's the founding premise of the Anti-Defamation League itself ... Richardson, who was a popular player in Israel during his NBA exile years, is guilty of nothing more than free speech. Even if his observations were wrong--which they are not--there's nothing at all insulting about them. What is insulting is the notion that you can't speak honestly about Jews without getting into trouble.

 Oklahoma / Lawton-Fort Sill Cavalry (2007–2011) 
On May 24, 2007, Richardson was named head coach of the reincarnated Oklahoma Cavalry of the CBA. On December 16, 2007, he was fired by the Cavalry, for sticking up for his players when their paychecks bounced, but rehired the next season.

Richardson coached for the relocated Lawton-Ft Sill Cavalry located in Lawton, Oklahoma, winning three consecutive championships in 2008-2010. Richardson led the Cavalry to victory to the Continental Basketball Association Finals in 2008 and 2009 and in the Premiere Basketball League Finals in 2010.

Richardson was ejected from the first game of the 2010 Premiere Basketball League Championship Series. The ejection took place with under three seconds remaining in the game that was eventually won by Rochester in overtime 110-106. The ejection led to a skirmish between fans and several Lawton-Fort Sill players which ended the game with 2.6 seconds to go on the clock and Rochester about to go to the free-throw line.

 London Lightning (2011–2014) 
On August 17, 2011, Richardson was hired as the first head coach of NBL Canada's London Lightning. Richardson was named the NBL Canada's first ever Coach of the Month for November 2011, an award he would win again in January 2012. London finished the regular season at 28-8. On March 25, 2012, Richardson led the Lightning to a 116-92 victory over the Halifax Rainmen in the deciding Game Five of the NBL Canada Finals to win the NBL Canada's inaugural championship. After the game, Richardson was named the NBL Canada Coach of the Year for 2011–12.

On April 12, 2013, Richardson led the London to an 87-80 victory over the Summerside Storm and TLondon became back to back NBL champions.

Richardson left the London Lightning following the 2013–14 season to pursue coaching positions closer to home.

Personal life
Richardson lived in Lawton, Oklahoma, as of 2015. He has 11 grandchildren. Richardson puts on youth basketball clinics with Otis Birdsong, his longtime friend and former teammate. He worked for a financial firm, and he and his wife, Kimberly, owned a beauty salon. His son, Amir Richardson, is a professional soccer player in France.

Richardson was the subject of the TNT Network 2000 film Whatever Happened to Micheal Ray?, narrated by Chris Rock.

Honors
 Richardson was Inducted into the Montana Grizzly Basketball Hall of Fame in 1985.
 In 2001, Richardson was inducted into the Grizzly Sports Hall of Fame at the University of Montana.
 Richardson was named to the list of Big Sky Conference 50 Greatest Male Athletes in 2013.

NBL coaching record

 NBA career statistics 

 Regular season 

|-
| style="text-align:left;"| 1978–79
| style="text-align:left;"| New York
| 72 ||  || 16.9 || .414 ||  || .539 || 3.2 || 3.0 || 1.4 || .3 || 6.5
|-
| style="text-align:left;"| 1979–80
| style="text-align:left;"| New York
| 82 ||  || 37.3 || .472 || .245 || .660 || 6.6 || style="background:#cfecec;"|10.1* || style="background:#cfecec;"|3.2* || .4 || 15.3
|-
| style="text-align:left;"| 1980–81
| style="text-align:left;"| New York
| 79 ||  || 40.2 || .469 || .225 || .663 || 6.9 || 7.9 || 2.9 || .4 || 16.4
|-
| style="text-align:left;"| 1981–82
| style="text-align:left;"| New York
| 82 || 79 || 37.1 || .461 || .188 || .700 || 6.9 || 7.0 || 2.6 || .5 || 17.9
|-
| style="text-align:left;"| 1982–83
| style="text-align:left;"| Golden State
| 33 || 25 || 32.5 || .412 || .129 || .632 || 4.4 || 7.4 || style="background:#cfecec;"|3.1* || .3 || 12.5
|-
| style="text-align:left;"| 1982–83
| style="text-align:left;"| New Jersey
| 31 || 26 || 32.3 || .438 || .200 || .671 || 4.8 || 6.0 || 2.6 || .5 || 12.7
|-
| style="text-align:left;"| 1983–84
| style="text-align:left;"| New Jersey
| 48 || 25 || 26.8 || .460 || .241 || .704 || 3.6 || 4.5 || 2.1 || .4 || 12.0
|-
| style="text-align:left;"| 1984–85
| style="text-align:left;"| New Jersey
| 82 || 82 || 38.1 || .469 || .252 || .767 || 5.6 || 8.2 || style="background:#cfecec;"|3.0* || .3 || 20.1|-
| style="text-align:left;"| 1985–86
| style="text-align:left;"| New Jersey
| 47 || 39 || 34.1 || .448 || .148 || .788 || 5.3 || 7.2 || 2.7 || .2 || 15.7
|-
| style="text-align:center;" colspan="2"| Career
| 556 || 276 || 33.4 || .457 || .220 || .690 || 5.5 || 7.0 || 2.6 || .4 || 14.8
|-
| style="text-align:center;" colspan="2"| All-Star
| 4 || 0 || 17.5 || .469 || .000 || .500 || 2.5 || 2.5 || 2.3 || .0 || 8.0

 Playoffs 

|-
| style="text-align:left;"| 1981
| style="text-align:left;"| New York
| 2 ||  || 43.0 || .242 || .000 || .583 || 9.5 || 5.5 || 3.5 || .0 || 11.5
|-
| style="text-align:left;"| 1983
| style="text-align:left;"| New Jersey
| 2 ||  || 29.0 || .381 || .000 || .600 || 4.0 || 2.5 || 2.5 || .0 || 9.5
|-
| style="text-align:left;"| 1984
| style="text-align:left;"| New Jersey
| 11 ||  || 40.3 || .408 || .273 || .732 || 4.9 || 7.2 || 3.1 || .4 || 16.8
|-
| style="text-align:left;"| 1985
| style="text-align:left;"| New Jersey
| 3 || 3 || 41.7 || .404 || .000 || .643 || 6.0 || 11.3 || 1.3 || .0 || 18.3'
|-
| style="text-align:center;" colspan="2"| Career
| 18 || 3 || 39.6 || .386 || .207 || .690 || 5.5 || 7.2 || 2.8 || .2 || 15.7

See also
List of National Basketball Association career steals leaders
List of National Basketball Association players with 9 or more steals in a game

References

External links
 
 FIBA EuroLeague Profile
 Italian League Profile 

1955 births
Living people
20th-century African-American sportspeople
21st-century African-American people
African-American basketball coaches
African-American basketball players
Albany Patroons players
American expatriate basketball people in Canada
American expatriate basketball people in Croatia
American expatriate basketball people in France
American expatriate basketball people in Italy
American men's basketball coaches
American men's basketball players
American sportspeople in doping cases
Basketball coaches from Texas
Basketball players from Texas
Cholet Basket players
Continental Basketball Association coaches
Doping cases in basketball
Golden State Warriors players
KK Split players
Libertas Liburnia Basket Livorno players
Montana Grizzlies basketball players
National Basketball Association All-Stars
National Basketball Association players banned for drug offenses
New Jersey Nets players
New York Knicks draft picks
New York Knicks players
Olympique Antibes basketball players
Point guards
Shooting guards
Sportspeople from Lubbock, Texas
United States Basketball League players
Virtus Bologna players